House Party 2 is a 1991 American comedy film and the sequel to the 1990 film House Party released by New Line Cinema. The film returns most of the cast of the first film such as Kid 'n Play and Full Force, along with new cast members such as Queen Latifah and Iman, and more guest appearances by other famous entertainers, such as Tony! Toni! Toné! and Ralph Tresvant. The film is directed by Doug McHenry and George Jackson in their directorial debut.

In contrast to the original, House Party 2 focuses more on the party aspect of the plot. Instead, it focuses more on the characters' personal lives ranging from dating to education and career ambitions. The titular festivities, this time around, is a college pajama party instead of a high school house party.

The film is dedicated to the memory of Robin Harris, who played Pops in the first film.

Plot 
After high school graduation and his father's passing, Kid, with scholarship money provided by the congregation of his church, is able to go off to college with his high school sweetheart, Sidney.  Play, now driving a Ford Mustang instead of his beat up old wagon, meets Sheila Landreaux and her associate Rick. Really a con artist, Sheila convinces Play she's a record executive and she'd like to sign him, he just has to put some money down in order to start recording.

Lured by dreams of stardom, Play signs over Kid's college scholarship check. Unaware of Play's actions, Kid starts school and meets his roommate Jamal Johnson, a white kid with an obsession for all things Black. But when Kid tries to enroll in his classes, he realizes he left his scholarship check in Play’s car, thus he cannot pay his tuition and enrollment fees. When Kid goes to receive his check, he fights Play after finding out what Play did with his check. Kid then tries to reason with the dean but is only given a week to pay his tuition fees or face being kicked out of college. The dean's assistant, Miles, helps Kid with an extension and a job in the dining hall, working for Mr. Lee, a man who runs the dining hall like a military officer and insists Kid wear a hair net.

At the same time, Zora Henderson, Sidney’s socially conscious roommate, tells her that Kid is just a boy and she should use her college experience to explore and date real men, causing extra strain on Kid, in addition to having to work to pay for school as well as having to write a big paper for a demanding professor. To top it off, Kid is hunted and persecuted by his high school bullies, Stab, Zilla, and Pee Wee, who take jobs as campus security.

While visiting Kid on campus, Play, in another one of his schemes, has an idea that would make Kid's life easier - hold a pajama party in the school's dining hall. But Kid refuses, both out of his mistrust in Play and his fear of Mr. Lee, leaving Play to have to come up with another way to repay Kid.

Kid settles in as his perseverance pays off and he gains the approval, and trust, of Mr. Lee. However, Play is unable to get the money back from the con artists in time to pay for Kid's tuition. Plus, Sidney wants to just be friends, and starts dating Miles, the dean's assistant as Miles only helped Kid in order to get close to Sidney.

Fed up and left with no other choice, in order to raise the money needed for his tuition and win back Sidney, Kid, Play, Bilal and Kid's roommate, Jamal secretly hold a pajama themed party for the students in the faculty dining hall to raise money for Kid to stay in college, prompting Kid to steal the key to the faculty dining hall. Admission is $10 for men and free for women who wear nightwear. Campus security tries to get information on the party by pretending to be students, but their antics are unsuccessful.

The party is a huge success as hundreds of students turn up wearing elaborate costumes, and dance the night away, including to a memorable performance by Kid and Play.

After their performance, Play sees the con artists trying to coerce Zora. Kid sees Miles with Sidney trying to drug her. Kid, Play and campus security go upstairs to stop the con artists and Miles. Kid fights Miles on the roof. The dean and the police come in to stop the party. Play tells the dean that Sheila & Rick are the con artists who stole Kid’s scholarship check, they along with Miles are arrested with the latter also being fired from his job.

The dean tells Kid, Play, Bilal, and Jamal to clean up the faculty dining hall or they will face expulsion. Kid gives the money to Mr.Lee for the damages. With all of his options exhausted, Kid still has to drop out of school and advises Mr. Lee and Professor Sinclair that he will be dropping out of school but will be back when he can pay for it. Sinclair tells him that everyone who drops out always says they'll be back, but never does, telling Kid he better be the one of the few who does come back.

Meanwhile, Play sells his Ford Mustang convertible. Kid goes to his father’s grave to try and sort things out. He then heads back to his dorm room to move the rest of his things out. Play then arrives in his beat up old wagon, and gives Kid tuition money, feeling guilty about using Kid’s scholarship check in the first place. Kid asks where he got the money from, but notices that Play doesn’t have the mustang anymore. Realizing he sold it to give Kid his tuition money. Kid wants to go out and celebrate with him and Bilal but Play tells him to hit the books, also telling him that he’s gonna be coming around the university periodically to check with his professors, seeing as he’s an investment now, before driving off to the sunset.

Cast 

 Christopher Reid as Christopher "Kid" Robinson, Jr.
 Christopher Martin as Peter "Play" Martin
 Martin Lawrence as Bilal
 Paul Anthony George as Stab
 Lucien "Bowlegged Lou" George, Jr. as Pee-Wee
 Brian "B-Fine" George as Zilla
 Tisha Campbell as Sidney
 Kamron as Jamal Johnson
 Iman as Sheila Landreaux
 Queen Latifah as Zora Henderson
 Georg Stanford Brown as Prof. Sinclair
 Louie Louie as Rick
 Helen Martin as Mrs. Deevers
 William Schallert as Dean Kramer
 Tony Burton as Mr. Lee
 Christopher Judge as Miles (credited as D. Christopher Judge)
 Whoopi Goldberg as the professor

Music

Soundtrack 

A soundtrack containing hip hop and R&B music was released on October 15, 1991 by MCA Records. It peaked at 55 on the
Billboard 200 and 23 on the Top R&B/Hip-Hop Albums, becoming the most successful of the House Party soundtracks.

Reception

Box office 
The movie debuted at No.1 at the box office.

Critical response 
Rotten Tomatoes gives the film a score of 27% based on reviews from 15 critics.

Sequel 
A sequel to the film, titled House Party 3, was released on January 12, 1994.

References

External links 
 
 

1991 films
1991 independent films
1991 romantic comedy films
1990s buddy comedy films
1990s musical comedy films
1990s teen comedy films
1990s teen romance films
African-American films
American buddy comedy films
American independent films
American musical comedy films
American romantic comedy films
American romantic musical films
American sequel films
American teen comedy films
American teen romance films
1990s hip hop films
House Party films
New Line Cinema films
1991 directorial debut films
1990s English-language films
1990s American films